Marko Nikolić (20 October 1946 – 2 January 2019) was a Serbian actor. He appeared in more than one hundred films from 1967 to 2018.

Filmography

References

External links 

1946 births
2019 deaths
People from Kraljevo
Serbian male film actors